Cinema was introduced to Afghanistan at the beginning of the 20th century. Political troubles slowed the industry over the years; however, numerous Pashto and Dari films have been made both inside and outside Afghanistan throughout the 20th century. The cinema of Afghanistan entered a new phase in 2001, but has failed to recover to its popular pre-war status.

History
Emir Habibullah Khan, who reigned from 1901 to 1919, introduced film to Afghanistan, but in the royal court only. In 1923–24, the first projector or "magic box" or mageek lantan ('magic lantern') – showed the first silent film in Paghman to the public. The first Afghan film, Love and Friendship, was produced in 1946.

In Kabul, the Behzad Cinema became the first theatre in Afghanistan, and Cinema Park was also among the earliest to have been built in the 1950s. Among the most prominent cinemas in Kabul before the 1990s were the Pamir, Ariana, Aryub, Barikot and Baharistan cinemas.

When the Afghan Film Organization was established in 1968, it produced documentaries and news films highlighting the official meetings and conferences of the government. All these films were shown in cinemas before feature films, which were usually from India. The first feature film made in Kabul by Afghan Film using Afghan artists was Like Eagles starring Zahir Waida and a young girl named Najia. Soon after this, Afghan Film made a three-part film with the collective title Ages, which comprised Smugglers, Suitors and Friday Night. Two other films from the same era are Village Tunes and Difficult Days. All of these films were shot in black and white. Film artists of this era included Khan Aqa Soroor, Rafeeq Saadiq, Azizullah Hadaf, Mashal Honaryar and Parvin Sanatgar.

The first color films produced by Afghan Film in the early 1980s were 'Run Away' (Farar), 'Love Epic' (Hamaseh ishq), 'Saboor Soldier' (Saboor Sarbaaz), 'Ash' (Khakestar), 'Last Wishes' (Akharin Arezo) and 'Migrating Birds' (Pardehaje Mohajer). These films, usually shown only in urban areas, became popular.

During the late 1960s and 1970s Soviet aid included cultural training and scholarships for students interested in studying film. However, since Afghanistan had no film academy, future filmmakers had to apprentice on the job. The three civil wars of the 1990s were not conducive to creative work and many people working in the Afghan film industry escaped to Iran or Pakistan, where they were able to make videos for NGOs. The new government banned production of films in 1993.

When the Taliban took power in 1996, cinemas were attacked and many films were burnt. The Taliban forbade the viewing of television and films and cinemas were closed, either becoming tea shops or restaurants or falling into a state of disrepair. Habibullah Ali of Afghan Film hid thousands of films, buried underground or in hidden rooms, to prevent their destruction by the Taliban. Teardrops was the first post-Taliban film in 2002, and the first film since Oruj in 1990. On November 19, 2001, Bakhtar was the first cinema to re-open its doors, where thousands of people entered that day.

Afghan Film Organization
Afghan Film also known as Afghan Film Organization (AFO) were former Afghanistan's state-run film company. It was established in 1968 and the last president was Sahraa Karimi, the first female head of the organisation.

Reemergence
Since 2001, the cinema of Afghanistan has slowly started to re-emerge from a lengthy period of silence. Before the September 11th attacks, Afghanistan-based Iranian director Mohsen Makhmalbaf attracted world attention to Afghanistan with his Kandahar. The film brought the cinema of Afghanistan to the Cannes film festival for the first time in history. Later Samira Makhmalbaf, Siddiq Barmak, Razi Mohebi, Horace Shansab, Yassamin Maleknasr and Abolfazl Jalili made a significant contribution to Dari (Persian) cinema in Afghanistan.

Barmak's first Persian/Pashto film Osama (2003) won several awards at film festivals in Cannes and London. Barmak is also director of the Afghan Children Education Movement (ACEM), an association that promotes literacy, culture and the arts, founded by Iranian film director Mohsen Makhmalbaf. The school trains actors and directors for the emerging cinema of Afghanistan. In 2006 Afghanistan joined the Central Asian and Southern Caucasus Film Festivals Confederation.

In the 1970s and 1980s, it was not difficult to get women to act in films. The war and the Taliban rule changed the situation, but they now are increasingly represented in the cinema of Afghanistan. Actresses like Leena Alam, Amina Jafari, Saba Sahar (now also a director) and Marina Gulbahari have emerged over the last decade.

Apart from cinema in Persian, Pashto cinema is also flourishing in Afghanistan. Several Pashto language films have been made since the fall of the Taliban, including some by foreigners like Good Morning Afghanistan (2003) by Camilla Nielsson.

Kabullywood (2017) is a comedy-drama directed by Louis Meunier that was shot entirely in Kabul. As part of the movie, Meunier crowdfunded the renovation of the once-prosperous Aryub Cinema in the city, but without it opening as planned.

The public cinema industry has not managed to recover, with many cinemas in Kabul either falling into disrepair or attracting low numbers of customers. The issue reached national attention at the end of 2020 when the municipality decided to demolish the neglected but historic Cinema Park, sparking protests by activists.

B-movies
There are a number of films produced both inside and outside Afghanistan that are considered B-movies due to the low production quality and audience reach. These films are targeted mainly at an Afghan audience and rarely make it to the non-Afghan audiences or the international film festivals.

Outside Afghanistan
Since many filmmakers fled the country due to war, they began to make films outside Afghanistan. Some notable films made outside Afghanistan include the Shirin Gul-o-Shir Agha trilogy made in Russia, Foreign Land, Loori, Sheraghai Daghalbaaz, In the Wrong Hands, Shade of Fire, (Asheyana) London (khana Badosh) London (Do Atash) Holland (Waris) Holland 3 Friends, Al Qarem in United States, Shekast in Pakistan, Aftaab e Bighroob in Tajikistan, Kidnapping in Germany and in Italy Gridami, by Razi Mohebi.

Most notable of all were Academy Award submission FireDancer and French-based film Earth and Ashes.

Foreign films
Many foreign films were made within Afghanistan, including Indian films like Feroz Khan's Dharmatma and Khuda Gawah, and the American film The Beast.

Some films made in or relating to Afghanistan have been made, including Rambo III, Kabul Express, Escape From Taliban and the British film In This World. The Hollywood-produced The Kite Runner (2007) earned a nomination in the 80th Academy Awards for "Best Achievement in Music Written for Motion Pictures, Original Score".

In the mid-20th century one of the most popular foreign films that ran in Kabul's cinemas was the American epic Gone with the Wind (1939).

Notable individuals

Writers/Directors/Producers
 Mir Hamza Shinwari
 Engineer Ahmed Latif
 Roya Sadat
 Sahraa Karimi
 Saeed Orokzai
 Atiq Rahimi
 Abdul Wahid Nazari
 Siddiq Barmak
 Saba Sahar (Afghanistan's first female film director)
 Barmak Akram, Kabuli Kid - Wajma
 Salim Shaheen - Nominated for Cannes Film Festival

Superstars

Actors
 Nassir Aziz
 Ibrahim Tughyan
 Saeed Orokzai
 Faqir Nabi
 Youssof Kohzad
 Saboor Toofan
 Salam Sangi
 Mir Hamza Shinwari
 Salim Shaheen
 Haji Kamran
 Mamnoon Maqsoodi

Actresses

 Marina Golbahari 
 Leena Alam
 Zakia Kohzad
 Fereshteh Hosseini 
 Shamila Shirzad
 Hasiba Ebrahimi 
 Yasamin Yarmal
 Sahraa Karimi
 Adela Adem

Notable films

These films have had either theatrical distribution or won awards at prestigious film festivals. They also appear on IMDb's Most popular list.

 Kandahar (2001) - 20+ Film festivals
 Osama (2003) Winner of Golden Globes
 Earth and Ashes (2004)
 Zolykha's Secret (2006)
 Kabuli Kid (2008)
 Opium War (2008)
 Buzkashi Boys (2012)- Oscar nominee 
 The Black Tulip (2010)
 The Patience Stone (2012)
 Madrasa (2013)
 Wajma (2013), an Afghan Love Story
 A Few Cubic Meters of Love (2014)
 Mina Walking (2015)
 A Letter to the President (2017)
 Black Kite (2017)
 Why? (2019)

Feature films

Zolykha's Secret (2007;  in Persian) is also among the first feature films from post-Taliban Afghanistan, which played to full houses at major film festivals. The film's director, Horace Ahmad Shansab, trained young Afghan filmmakers and made the film entirely on location in Afghanistan.

Emaan (2010) was screened at Reading Cinemas in Australia. This is the first time an Afghan film has been screened at Reading. It was the winner of 2011 South Asian Film Festival in Canberra for Best Story and Best Film.

Notable short films include No Woman (2015) and We are postmodern.

Documentary films

Documentaries have been made in Afghanistan since the Taliban, most notably 16 Days in Afghanistan by Mithaq Kazimi and Postcards from Tora Bora by Wazhmah Osman.
The Boy who Plays on the Buddhas of Bamiyan, a documentary shot by award-winning British director Phil Grabsky was released in 2001 and went on to win awards worldwide.
There is also a monthly magazine, Theme, that is published by Afghan Cinema Club that focuses on Afghan and international cinema.

Highest grossing
The highest grossing Afghan film is Osama, earning $3,800,000 worldwide from a budget of only $46,000. The film was very well received by the Western cinematic world. It gathered a rating of 96% based on 100 reviews collected by Rotten Tomatoes.

See also
 Cinema of the world

References

External links
Oscar Nominations
Afghan cinema
Afghan Cinema - Network for Afghan filmmakers

IMDB: Afghanistan
Movie Movie - A chronological history of Afghan cinema from 1946 to the present day.

 
Afghan culture